Elections for Boston Borough Council, which governs as a second-tier authority the Borough of Boston were held on Thursday 2 May 2019. The election was held on the same day as other local elections.

Results summary

Ward results

Coastal

Fenside

Fishtoft

Five Villages

Kirton and Frampton

Old Leake and Wrangle

Skirbeck

St. Thomas

Staniland

Station

Swineshead and Holland Fen

Trinity

West

Witham

Wyberton

References

2019 English local elections
2019
2010s in Lincolnshire
May 2019 events in the United Kingdom